Aston (or Aston-by-Sutton) is a village and civil parish in the unitary authority of Cheshire West and Chester and the ceremonial county of Cheshire, England. According to the 2001 census it had a population of 111, reducing slightly to 106 at the 2011 census. The village is just outside the Runcorn urban area.

St Peter's Church is a Grade I listed building.

Aston was the seat of the Aston baronets of the County of Chester (baronetcy created 1628, extinct 1815).

See also

 Listed buildings in Aston-by-Sutton

References

External links
 
 

Villages in Cheshire
Civil parishes in Cheshire
Cheshire West and Chester